Allan Padua (born March 26, 1969), known professionally as Mura, is a Filipino actor and comedian who has dwarfism.

Early life
Allan Padua was born in Guinobatan, Albay. He spent most of his childhood in Guinobatan with his 13 siblings. Born with dwarfism, his father believes that he inherited his small stature from the doll his mother used to play with through the folk belief of lihi. Allan Padua received ridicule growing up in elementary school and by his neighbors due to his small stature.

Career
Padua capitalized on his condition by working as a ball juggler for five years as a means to financially support his family. He aspired to be an actor, and sang as a pastime. In 2002, he went to Manila for better job opportunities securing a role as a backup dancer. He was then scouted by a talent manager who asked him to play a bigger role in a show.

Later adopting the screenname "Mura", Padua had break in his entertainment career in 2003, when he became associated with Mahal, an actress-comedian who also has dwarfism. Mura became known as Mahal's "twin" and occasionally played the "sidekick" roles to characters portrayed by actor Vhong Navarro.

Mura also ventured into singing with Noemi Tesorero, better known as Mahal, who also has dwarfism, with whom he formed a tandem in Magandang Tanghali Bayan.

Mura played roles in several feature films such as Volta (2004), D' Anothers (2005), Agent X44 (2007) and Supahpapalicious (2008) and Kimidora and the Temple of Kyeme (2012). Mura also made appearances in other television shows such as Majika (2006) and Supertwins (2007). In 2005, he was able to purchase farmland in Bicol using his earning as an actor.

Accident and later career
Mura's career saw a decline in 2010. He was involved in a vehicular accident while riding a tricycle which affected his hips and legs. The accident caused him to have long-term difficulty in walking affecting his future prospects in acting.

Mura was to feature in FPJ's Ang Probinsyano, sometime prior to key actor Eddie Garcia's death in 2019, but the stint did not push through due to Mura's weakened legs making him unable to run.

As of 2021, Mura works as a farmer in Bicol, but still intends to return to showbiz.

Filmography

Film

Television

Discography

References

External links
 

1969 births
Living people
Actors with dwarfism
Filipino male film actors
Filipino television personalities
Filipino male comedians
People from Albay
21st-century Filipino male actors
Entertainers with dwarfism
Filipino people with disabilities
Filipino farmers
ABS-CBN personalities
GMA Network personalities